Oliver M. Spencer (1829 – July 27, 1895) was the third President of the University of Iowa, serving from 1862 to 1867.

Presidents of the University of Iowa
1829 births
1895 deaths
19th-century American educators